The Mohegan are an Algonquian Native American tribe historically based in present-day Connecticut. Today the majority of the people are associated with the Mohegan Indian Tribe, a federally recognized tribe living on a reservation in the eastern upper Thames River valley of south-central Connecticut. It is one of two federally recognized tribes in the state, the other being the Mashantucket Pequot, whose reservation is in Ledyard, Connecticut. There are also three state-recognized tribes: the Schaghticoke, Paugusett, and Eastern Pequot. 

At the time of European contact, the Mohegan and Pequot were a unified tribal entity living in the southeastern Connecticut region, but the Mohegan gradually became independent as the hegemonic Pequot lost control over their trading empire and tributary groups. The name Pequot was given to the Mohegan by other tribes throughout the northeast and was eventually adopted by themselves. In 1637, English Puritan colonists destroyed a principal fortified village at Mistick with the help of their sachem Uncas, the Christian convert and sagamore Wequash Cooke, and the Narragansetts during the Pequot War. This ended with the death of Uncas' cousin Sassacus near Albany, New York, where he had fled, at the hands of the Mohawk, an Iroquois Confederacy nation from west of the Hudson River. Thereafter, the Mohegan became a separate tribal nation under the leadership of Uncas. Uncas is a variant anglicized spelling of the Algonquian name Wonkus, which translates to "fox" in English. The word Mohegan (pronounced ) translates in their respective Algonquin dialects (Mohegan-Pequot language) as "People of the Wolf".

Over time, the Mohegan gradually lost ownership of much of their tribal lands. In 1978, Chief Rolling Cloud Hamilton petitioned for federal recognition of the Mohegan. Descendants of his Mohegan band operate independently of the federally recognized nation.

In 1994, a majority group of Mohegan gained federal recognition as the Mohegan Tribe of Indians of Connecticut (MTIC). They have been defined by the United States government as the "successor in interest to the aboriginal entity known as the Mohegan Indian Tribe." The United States took land into trust the same year, under an act of Congress to serve as a reservation for the tribe.

Most of the Mohegan people in Connecticut today live on the Mohegan Reservation at  near Uncasville in the Town of Montville, New London County. The MTIC operate the Mohegan Sun Casino on their reservation in Uncasville and the Mohegan Pennsylvania racetrack and casino near Wilkes-Barre, Pennsylvania.

History
The Mohegan Indian Tribe was historically based in central southern Connecticut, originally part of the Pequot people. It gradually became independent and served as allies of English colonists in the Pequot War of 1636, which broke the power of the formerly dominant Pequot tribe in the region. In reward, the Colonists gave Pequot captives to the Mohegan tribe.

The Mohegan homelands in Connecticut include landmarks such as Trading Cove on the Thames River, Cochegan Rock, Fort Shantok, and Mohegan Hill, where the Mohegan founded a Congregational church in the early 1800s. In 1931, the Tantaquidgeon family built the Tantaquidgeon Indian Museum on Mohegan Hill to house tribal artifacts and histories. Gladys Tantaquidgeon (1899-2005) served for years as the Tribe's medicine woman and unofficial historian. She studied anthropology at the University of Pennsylvania and worked for a decade with the Bureau of Indian Affairs. Returning to Connecticut, she operated this museum for six decades. It was one of the first museums to be owned and operated by American Indians.

In 1933, John E. Hamilton (Chief Rolling Cloud) was appointed as a Grand Sachem by his mother Alice Storey through a traditional selection process based on heredity.  She was a direct descendant of Uncas and of Tamaquashad, Sachem of the Pequot tribe. In Mohegan tradition, the position of tribal leadership was often hereditary through the maternal line.

Land claims and federal recognition
In the 1960s, during a period of rising activism among Native Americans, John Hamilton filed a number of land claims authorized by the "Council of Descendants of Mohegan Indians." The group had some 300 members at the time. In 1970 the Montville band of Mohegans expressed its dissatisfaction with land-claims litigation. When the Hamilton supporters left the meeting, this band elected Courtland Fowler as their new leader. Notes of that Council meeting referred to Hamilton as Sachem.

The group led by John Hamilton (although opposed by the Fowlers) worked with the attorney Jerome Griner in federal land claims through the 1970s. During this time, a Kent, Connecticut, property owners' organization, with some Native and non-Native members, worked to oppose the Hamilton land claims and the recognition petition for federal recognition, out of fear that tribal nations would take private properties.

In 1978, in response to the desires of tribal nations across the country to gain federal recognition and recover tribal sovereignty, the Bureau of Indian Affairs (BIA) established a formal administrative process. The process included specific criteria that BIA officials would judge as evidence of cultural continuity. In that same year, Hamilton's band submitted a petition for federal recognition for the Mohegan tribe.

The petition process stalled when John Hamilton died in 1988. The petition for federal recognition was revived in 1989, but the BIA's preliminary finding was that the Mohegan had not satisfied the criteria of documenting continuity in social community, and political authority and influence as a tribe through the twentieth century.

In 1990, the Mohegan band led by Chief Courtland Fowler submitted a detailed response to meet the BIA's concerns. The tribe included compiled genealogies and other records, including records pertaining to the Mohegan Congregational Church in Montville. BIA researchers used records provided by the Hamilton band, records from the Mohegan Church, and records maintained by Gladys Tantaquidgeon, who had kept genealogy and vital statistics of tribal members for her anthropological research.

In 1990, the Fowler group, identifying as the Mohegan Tribe of Indians of Connecticut (MTIC), decided that the tribe's membership would be restricted to documented descendants from a single family group, ca. 1860. This criterion excludes some of the Hamilton followers. By law, a Federally recognized tribe has the authority to determine its own rules for membership. The MTIC unsuccessfully attempted to stop other Mohegan people from using "Mohegan" as their tribal identity, in public records and in craftwork.

In its 1994 "Final Determination," the BIA cited the vital statistics and genealogies as documents that were decisive in demonstrating "that the tribe did indeed have social and political continuity during the middle of the 20th century." As a result, the Mohegan Tribe of Indians of Connecticut (MTIC) gained recognition as a sovereign tribal nation.

That same year, Congress passed the Mohegan Nation (Connecticut) Land Claim Settlement Act, which authorized the United States to take land into trust to establish a reservation for the Mohegan and settle their land claim. The final 1994 agreement between MTIC and the State in the settlement of land claims extinguished all pending land claims. The MTIC adopted a written constitution. MTIC is governed by a chief, an elected chairman and an elected tribal council, all of whom serve for specific terms.

The Mohegan people associated with Sachem John Hamilton persist as an independent group today. In his will, Hamilton named his non-Mohegan wife, Eleanor Fortin as Sachem. She is now the leader of the "Hamilton group." Despite their contentious histories and disagreements, both groups continued to participate in tribal activities and to identify as members of the Mohegan people. The Hamilton band of Mohegans continues to function and govern themselves independently of the MTIC, holding periodic gatherings and activities in their traditional territory of south-central Connecticut.

Extinction and Revival of Language
The last living native speaker of the Mohegan language, Fidelia "Flying Bird" A. Hoscott Fielding, died in 1908. The Mohegan language was recorded primarily in her diaries, and in articles and a Smithsonian Institution report made by the early anthropologist, Frank Speck.  Her niece, Gladys Tantaquidgeon, worked to preserve the language. Since 2012, the Mohegan Tribe has established a project to revive its language and establish new generations of native speakers.

Ethnobotany

The Mohegan people have always had extensive knowledge of local flora and fauna, of hunting and fishing technologies, of seasonal adaptations, and of herbal medicine, as practices passed down through the generations. Gladys Tantaquidgeon was instrumental in recording herbal medicinal knowledge and folklore, and in comparing these plants and practices to those of other Algonquian peoples like the Lenni Lenape (Delaware) and Wampanoag,

For example, an infusion of bark removed from the south side of the silver maple tree is used by the Mohegan for cough medicine. The Mohegan also use the inner bark of the sugar maple as a cough remedy, and the sap as a sweetening agent and to make maple syrup.

Confusion with the Mohican people
Although similar in name, the Mohegan are a different tribe from the Mohican, who share similar Algonkian culture and the members of whom constitute another speech community with the greater Algonquian language family.

The Mohican (also called the Stockbridge Mohican) were historically based along the upper Hudson River in present-day eastern New York and along the upper Housatonic River in western Massachusetts.  In the United States, both tribes have been referred to in various historic documents by the spelling "Mohican", based on mistakes in translation and location. But, the Dutch colonist Adriaen Block, one of the first Europeans to record the names of both tribes, clearly distinguished between the "Morhicans" (now the Mohegans) and the "Mahicans, Mahikanders, Mohicans, [or] Maikens".

In 1735, Housatonic Mohican leaders negotiated with Massachusetts Governor Jonathan Belcher to found the town of  Stockbridge, Massachusetts, just to the west of the Berkshire Mountains, as a mission village. After the American Revolution, these Mohican people, along with New York Mohicans and members of the Wappinger of the east bank of the central and lower Hudson River, relocated to central New York to live among the native Oneida people. In time the settlement became known as Stockbridge, New York. During the 1820s the majority of these people removed further west, eventually settling in Wisconsin, where today they constitute the Stockbridge Munsee Band of Mohican Indians. These removals inspired the myth of the "Last of the Mohicans."

Most of the descendants of the Mohegan tribe, by contrast, have continued to live in New England, and particularly in Connecticut, since the colonial era.

Notable Mohegans
 Uncas (c. 1588 – c. 1683), famed sachem of the Mohegan 
 Oneco, son of Uncas
 Mahomet Weyonomon (c. 1700–1736), sachem who traveled to England in 1735 to seek better treatment of his people.
 Samson Occom (1723–1792), Presbyterian minister, who helped relocate the Brothertown Indians to New York state. 
 Fidelia Hoscott Fielding (1827–1908), last native speaker of the Mohegan-Pequot language.
 Emma Fielding Baker (1828-1916), revivalist of the Green Corn Ceremony and Tribal Chairperson
 John E. Hamilton (1897-1988), Grand Sachem Chief Rolling Cloud, Indian rights activist 
 Gladys Tantaquidgeon (1899–2005), anthropologist, herbalist, co-founder of the Tantaquidgeon Museum. Worked to preserve Mohegan culture through the 20th century. 
 Faith Davison (1940-2019), researcher, consultant
 Melissa Tantaquidgeon Zobel (b. 1960)(née Melissa Jane Fawcett), Mohegan Tribal Historian and author of several books on Mohegan culture, including Medicine Trail: The Life and Lessons of Gladys Tantaquidgeon (2000)
 Stephanie Fielding, linguist
 Madeline Sayet (b. 1989), writer, director, actress.

In Literature 
Lydia Sigourney published her poem  in her 1827 collection of poetry. The first she describes as a rough rocky recess in the region of Mohegan and known as "the chair of Uncas": Mazeen she calls the last of the royal line of the Mohegan nation.

See also 

 Mohegan Indian Tribe
 Brothertown Indians
 Pequot people
 Mohegan Sun

References

External links 

 Mohegan Tribe Homepage
 Native American Mohegans 
 Mohegan Nation (Connecticut) Land Claim Settlement Act of 1994
 Davies, Lindrith, "Casinos and Nations" , self-published at Understand Connecticut website
Faith Damon Davison, A Poor Little Village

Algonquian peoples
Norwich, Connecticut
Native American tribes in Connecticut
Algonquian ethnonyms
People from Montville, Connecticut